Kilam or (Kelam) is a village in Devsar Tehsil in the Kulgam district of Jammu and Kashmir.

Divisions
Kilam has two divisions namely Kilam A and Kilam B. The Kilam Mirbazar Road divides the village into two parts. Small part towards Gund and large portion in which Dangarpora and Herpora are located towards Agroo and Devsar.

Kilam-A is surrounded by Qaimoh tehsil towards east, Kulgam tehsil towards south, Anantnag tehsil towards east, Qazigund tehsil towards east.
Kilam is surrounded by Zungalpora (west) Agroo, Zahipor and Koddar Hablish (east), Gund (north) villages and Devsar town (south).

Education
Government Degree College, Kelam is a co-education college established in 2008.

See also 
 Zeipora

References

Villages in Kulgam district